Tobias Jenkins was one of two Members of the Parliament of England for the constituency of York between 1694 and 1705. He again represented the city as MP in the Parliament of Great Britain between 1715–1722.

Life and politics

Tobias Jenkins, born in 1660, was the son of Colonel Tobias Jenkins and his wife, Antonyna Wickham. His paternal grandfather, Sir Henry Jenkins was also MP for Boroughbridge. He was made freeman of the city of York on 2 October 1695 just prior to being returned as MP for the city.

Tobias did not stand in the first elections of 1701 as he had been elected Lord Mayor of York. He did stand in the second elections of that year and was returned after a contest. He stood down in 1705 in favour of his nephew Robert Benson. He next stood for election on 1713 after Benson had been made a peer. Tobias was defeated by Robert Fairfax, but was successful in the same contest in 1715.

Tobias was married twice. First to Lady Mary Paulet, daughter of Charles, Duke of Bolton. They had two children. Elizabeth and Mary, who married Sir Henry Goodricke, 4th Baronet of Ribston, in York Minster on 26 April 1707. He had three children by his second marriage, William, Tobias and Anthonina.

He died intestate in 1730.

References

Lord Mayors of York
Members of the Parliament of England for constituencies in Yorkshire
English MPs 1695–1698
English MPs 1698–1700
English MPs 1701
English MPs 1701–1702
English MPs 1702–1705
British MPs 1715–1722
1660 births
1730 deaths